Cathedral Basilica of the Nativity of the Blessed Virgin Mary in Sandomierz is a gothic cathedral constructed in 1360. The cathedral was renovated in the baroque style in the 18th century, and first received the rank of cathedral in 1818.

Blood libel paintings 

This cathedral contains a series of paintings built into the church's wooden panelling depicting the Martyrologium Romanum. The third painting shows the scene of a supposed blood libel which is claimed "...depicts ritual murders committed in Sandomierz by Tatarians on Christian children". The inscription next to the painting reads filius apothecarii ab infidelibus judeis sandomiriensibus occisus (English: son of an apothecary, killed by infidel Sandomierz Jews).

Gallery

References

Basilica churches in Poland
Roman Catholic cathedrals in Poland
Cathedral Sandomierz
Churches completed in 1360
Gothic architecture in Poland
Churches in Świętokrzyskie Voivodeship
Blood libel